The 2007–08 Louisville Cardinals men's basketball team represented the University of Louisville in the 2007–08 NCAA Division I men's basketball season. The Cardinals, led by 7th year head coach Rick Pitino, played their home games at Freedom Hall and were a member of the Big East Conference. The team finished their season with an overall record of 27–9 (14–5 in the Big East) (.750 overall, .737 in the Big East).

The Cardinals entered the season as a co-favorite to win the 2007–08 Big East men's basketball title and was ranked sixth in the preseason Associated Press Poll. The Cardinals lost four graduating seniors from the previous season and graduated three after the season ended.

Regular season
The Cardinals entered the season as a co-favorite to win the 2007–08 Big East men's basketball title. The Associated Press also ranked the Cardinals sixth in their preseason poll.

The Cardinals won the first three games of the season before losing to BYU 78–76 on November 23, 2007. Going into the new year, the team was 9–3 and had played all but one game at Freedom Hall. During the month of January, the team went 6–3 overall and 4–4 against Big East competition. Their first game in Big East competition was on New Years Day, 2008 against Cincinnati, where the team lost 58–57. Between January 28 and March 8, 2008, the team went on a nine-game winning streak and did not lose during the month of February. The team finished the regular season with a loss to Big East rival Georgetown, losing 55–52. The team finished the regular season with an overall record of 24–7 (.774). Against Big East competition, the team compiled a 14–4 (.778) record and finished second in the conference. In three of the four losses to Big East rivals, the Cardinals lost by three or fewer points.

Postseason
The Cardinals made appearances in both the Big East tournament and the NCAA tournament. They finished the season ranked sixth in the Coaches Poll and thirteenth in the AP Poll. At the conclusion of the season, the team graduated three seniors.

Big East tournament
The team made an early exit from the Big East tournament with a 76–69 overtime loss to Pitt. Pitt would go on to defeat Georgetown in the championship game and win the tournament.

NCAA tournament
For the third time in four years, the Cardinals qualified for the NCAA tournament and were seeded third in the East bracket. They started off the tournament by defeating 14th-seeded Boise State 75–61. They also beat 6th-seeded Oklahoma 78–48 and 2nd-seeded Tennessee 79–60 before getting eliminated by 1st-seeded North Carolina (lost 83–73) in the Elite Eight. The team finished the season with an overall record of 27–9 (14–4 in the Big East).

References 

Louisville Cardinals men's basketball seasons
Louisville
Louisville Cardinals men's basketball, 2007-08
Louisville Cardinals men's basketball, 2007-08
Louisville